Alex Bachman (born May 29, 1996) is an American football wide receiver for the Houston Texans of the National Football League (NFL). He played college football at Wake Forest.

College career
Bachman was a member of the Wake Forest Demon Deacons for four seasons. As a senior, he caught 37 passes for 541 yards and six touchdowns. Bachman finished his collegiate career with 82 receptions for 1,162 yards and ten touchdowns in 32 games played.

Professional career

Los Angeles Rams
Bachman was signed by the Los Angeles Rams as an undrafted free agent on April 29, 2019. He was waived/injured during final roster cuts on August 31, 2019, and reverted to injured reserve the next day. He was waived by the Rams with an injury settlement on September 5, 2019.

New York Giants
Bachman was signed to the New York Giants practice squad on November 12, 2019. He signed a reserve/futures contract with the team on December 30, 2019.

Bachman was waived during final roster cuts on September 5, 2020, and signed to the practice squad the next day. He was released on September 15, 2020, but he was re-signed to the practice squad on October 5, 2020. Bachman was elevated to the active roster on October 22 and made his NFL debut on that night in a 22–21 loss to the Philadelphia Eagles. He reverted to the practice squad after the game on October 23. 

He signed a reserve/future contract on January 4, 2021. He was placed on injured reserve on August 31, 2021, and shortly released. On November 3, 2021, Bachman was signed to the practice squad. On December 18, 2021, Bachman was activated from the practice squad as a COVID-19 replacement for the game against the Dallas Cowboys. He signed a reserve/future contract with the Giants on January 11, 2022.

On August 30, 2022, Bachman was waived by the Giants.

Houston Texans
On November 15, 2022, Bachman signed with the practice squad of the Houston Texans. He signed a reserve/future contract on January 10, 2023.

References

External links
New York Giants bio
Wake Forest Demon Deacons bio

1996 births
Living people
Players of American football from California
Sportspeople from Los Angeles County, California
Sportspeople from Ventura County, California
American football wide receivers
Wake Forest Demon Deacons football players
Los Angeles Rams players
New York Giants players
Houston Texans players
People from Westlake Village, California